Hilton Obenzinger (born 1947 Brooklyn) is an American novelist, poet, history and criticism writer.

Life
Obenzinger was born in Brooklyn in 1947, and raised in Queens.  He graduated from Columbia University in 1969 and from Stanford University with a PhD in 1997. He was active in the Columbia University protests of 1968. He taught at the Yurok Indian reservation along the Klamath River in northern California, 1969–1970.
He taught at Stanford University, where he is associate director of the Chinese Railroad Workers in North America Project.

Awards
 1982 American Book Award for This Passover or the next, I will never be in Jerusalem

Bibliography

References

External links

"Hilton Obenzinger", Columbia 1968

1947 births
Columbia College (New York) alumni
Stanford University alumni
Stanford University School of Humanities and Sciences faculty
Jewish peace activists
Living people
American Book Award winners
People from Queens, New York